Josué Humberto Gonçalves Leal de Sá (born 17 June 1992) is a Portuguese professional footballer who plays as a central defender for Rio Ave.
 
He began his career at Vitória de Guimarães. After a loan spell at Chaves he became a regular in the first team, playing 109 total games and scoring five goals. In August 2017, he joined Belgian club Anderlecht for a fee of €2,2 million, being loaned to Kasımpaşa and Huesca later on before being released.

Sá represented Portugal at youth level.

Club career

Vitória Guimarães
Born in Lisbon, Sá spent nine of his formative years with local Sporting CP, signing with Vitória S.C. at the age of 17. He started his senior career in 2011, being loaned by the latter to third division club G.D. Chaves.

Subsequently returned to Guimarães, Sá initially alternated between the first team and the recently created reserve side in the Segunda Liga. His first appearance in the Primeira Liga with the former was on 20 January 2013, when he came on as a late substitute in a 3−1 away win against Rio Ave FC.

Sá scored his first goal in the Portuguese top tier on 7 November 2014, in a 2−1 away victory over F.C. Arouca. He added another one during the season from 26 appearances, helping to an eventual fifth-place finish and qualification for the UEFA Europa League.

On 6 May 2016, Sá renewed his contract until 2019, with the release clause being improved from €3 to 8 million.

Anderlecht
Sá joined R.S.C. Anderlecht on 31 August 2017, after agreeing to a four-year deal. He made his Belgian First Division A debut on 1 October, playing the entire 1–0 home victory over Standard Liège.

Sá spent the following two seasons on loan, to Turkish Süper Lig's Kasımpaşa S.K. and SD Huesca of the Spanish Segunda División.

Ludogorets
On 2 October 2020, Sá joined PFC Ludogorets Razgrad of the First Professional Football League on a three-year contract.

International career
Four youth levels comprised, Sá won 28 caps for Portugal. His first for the under-21s arrived on 25 March 2013, in a 2−1 friendly defeat of the Republic of Ireland held in Dundalk.

Career statistics

Honours
Huesca
Segunda División: 2019–20

Ludogorets Razgrad
First Professional Football League (Bulgaria): 2020–21, 2021–22

References

External links

1992 births
Living people
Portuguese footballers
Footballers from Lisbon
Association football defenders
Primeira Liga players
Liga Portugal 2 players
Segunda Divisão players
Vitória S.C. players
G.D. Chaves players
Vitória S.C. B players
Rio Ave F.C. players
Belgian Pro League players
R.S.C. Anderlecht players
Süper Lig players
Kasımpaşa S.K. footballers
Segunda División players
SD Huesca footballers
First Professional Football League (Bulgaria) players
PFC Ludogorets Razgrad players
Israeli Premier League players
Maccabi Tel Aviv F.C. players
Portugal youth international footballers
Portugal under-21 international footballers
Portuguese expatriate footballers
Expatriate footballers in Belgium
Expatriate footballers in Turkey
Expatriate footballers in Spain
Expatriate footballers in Bulgaria
Expatriate footballers in Israel
Portuguese expatriate sportspeople in Belgium
Portuguese expatriate sportspeople in Turkey
Portuguese expatriate sportspeople in Spain
Portuguese expatriate sportspeople in Bulgaria
Portuguese expatriate sportspeople in Israel